Nikhil Kumar (born 15 July 1941) is a former IPS officer-turned politician hailing from Bihar who was Governor of Nagaland from 2009 to 2013 and Governor of Kerala from 2013 to 2014. One of country's well knownIPS officers of 1963 batch from the AGMUT Cadre Kumar also served as DGP of the National Security Guards, Indo-Tibetan Border Police, Railway Protection Force and Commissioner of Delhi Police. He was elected member of the 14th Lok Sabha of India from 2004 to 2009, representing the Aurangabad constituency in Bihar as a member of the Indian National Congress (INC) political party. He also served as the Chairman of the Parliamentary Committee on Information Technology.

Family background 

He is a son of Satyendra Narayan Sinha, who was Chief Minister of Bihar, a veteran Indian National Congress leader and a seven-term Member of Parliament, also from the constituency of Aurangabad.

His mother Kishori Sinha was MP for Vaishali and his wife Shyama Singh also represented Aurangabad in the Lok Sabha.

His grandfather Dr. Anugrah Narayan Sinha, known as Bihar Vibhuti, was the first Deputy Chief Minister cum Finance Minister of Bihar and an eminent Gandhian; his father "Chhote Saheb" was close in his later years to Jayaprakash Narayan and was one of the most prominent leaders of the anti-Emergency movement in Bihar and also the President of the Bihar wing of the Janata Party in 1977.

His brother-in-law is ex Rajya Sabha MP N. K. Singh, Chairman of 15th Finance Commission of India who has been among country's prominent bureaucrats and served as India's Revenue Secretary and also Principal Secretary to the Prime Minister.

Civil service 
He was educated at St. Xavier's High School, Patna and then at Allahabad University, where he earned an M.A. in Modern History.  He entered the civil service in 1963 and was an Indian Police Service officer assigned to the erstwhile Union Territory of Delhi. He held many important assignments and posts of national importance, in particular Additional Director General, Border Security Force (BSF) (1989–91;1992–94), Police Commissioner of New Delhi during 1995–97. In 1997-99 he became Special Secretary with charge of internal security at the Home Ministry. He also served as director-general of the Indo-Tibetan Border Police, and National Security Guards, a position he held till his retirement in July 2001. He was then appointed Member, National Security Advisory Board, Government of India (2001–03). He was awarded the Police Medal for Meritorious Service in 1977 and the President's Police Medal for Distinguished Service in 1985.

Governor of Nagaland 
He took the oath of office and secrecy as the Governor of Nagaland on 15 October 2009. He has been appointed a member of the Committee of Governors, constituted by the President of India to study and recommend measures for enhancing productivity, profitability, sustainability and competitiveness of the agriculture sector in India with special reference to rainfed area farming. He has been conferred with the prestigious Neelachakra Samman, during the national cultural festival Baisakhi Utsav at Jayadev Bhawan in Bhubaneswar.

Governor of Kerala 
 The President of India, Pranab Mukherjee, appointed him as Governor of Kerala on 9 March 2013. He had an illustrious tenure in the state and even in a short time, he was revered as a true "People’s Governor" and left his indelible mark on the people with ease and dignity. His astonishing capability to speak extempore on important policies, in his own inimitable style and his ability to communicate with the masses facilitated his deep and sympathetic involvement in all aspects of the life in the state of Kerala. He resigned as Governor on 4 March 2014 to contest the Lok Sabha Elections from Aurangabad in Bihar.

Positions held 
 1995-97: Commissioner of Police, Delhi (DGP rank)
 1997: Director-General Indo-Tibetan Border Police (ITBP)
 1997-99: Special Home Secretary (Internal Security), Government of India
 1999-01: Director-General National Security Guards
 2001-03: Member, National Security Advisory Board, Government of India
 2004-09: Elected to 14th Lok Sabha
 2009-13: Governor of Nagaland
 2013-14: Governor of Kerala

References

External links

 Brief Profile of Nikhil Kumar,Governor of Nagaland
Nikhil Kumar,Governor

1941 births
Living people
Governors of Kerala
Governors of Nagaland
Indian National Congress politicians from Bihar
Delhi politicians
Chiefs of police
Indian police chiefs
Indian civil servants
Bihar cadre civil servants
People from Vaishali district
Politicians from Patna
University of Allahabad alumni
Aurangabad, Bihar
India MPs 2004–2009
People from Aurangabad, Bihar
St. Xavier's Patna alumni
Lok Sabha members from Bihar
United Progressive Alliance candidates in the 2014 Indian general election
Commissioners of Delhi Police
Indian Police Service officers
Chiefs of Indo-Tibetan Border Police